Dave Smith may refer to:

Arts and entertainment
 Dave Smith (archivist) (1940–2019), American writer, founder of Walt Disney Company archives
 Dave Smith (poet) (born 1942), American poet
 Dave Smith (composer) (born 1949), British experimental composer
 Dave Smith (engineer) (1950–2022), proposer of the MIDI standard, synthesizer designer
 Dave Smith (Coronation Street), a character from British soap opera on ITV

Sports

American football
Dave Smith (American football coach) (1933–2009), former Texas A&M quarterback and SMU coach
Dave Smith (fullback) (born 1937), former American collegiate and Houston Oilers football player
Dave Smith (running back) (born 1947), former Green Bay Packers football player
Dave Smith (wide receiver) (1947–2020), former Pittsburgh Steelers football player

Association football
Dave Smith (footballer, born 1903) (1903–?), Scottish football goalkeeper
Dave Smith (footballer, born 1933) (1933–2022), Scottish football fullback for clubs including Burnley, managed several clubs in the 1970s/1980s
Dave Smith (footballer, born 1936) (1936–2015), English former professional footballer
Dave Smith (footballer, born 1943), Scotland international football midfielder, played in Scotland (for Aberdeen, Rangers, Berwick, etc.) and in the US, managed Berwick
Dave Smith (footballer, born 1947) (1947–2022), English football midfielder, played for Lincoln, Rotherham
Dave Smith (footballer, born 1950), English football striker, played for clubs including Huddersfield, Cambridge, Hartlepool
Dave Smith (footballer, born 1961), English football winger, played for Gillingham, Bristol City, etc.

Baseball
Dave Smith (pitcher, born 1914) (1914–1998), Major League Baseball relief pitcher
Dave Smith (pitcher, born 1955) (1955–2008), Major League Baseball relief pitcher
Dave Smith (pitcher, born 1957) (born 1957), Major League Baseball relief pitcher

Other sports
Dave Smith (boxer) (1886–1945), New Zealand-born heavyweight boxer
Dave Smith (triple jumper) (born 1947), American track and field athlete
Dave Smith (hammer thrower, born 1962), English Olympic hammer thrower
Dave Smith (hammer thrower, born 1974), English Olympic hammer thrower
Davey Boy Smith (1962–2002), British wrestler also known as "The British Bulldog"
Dave Smith (ice hockey) (born 1968), Canadian hockey head coach, Canisius College
Dave Smith (darts player) (born 1971), English darts player
David Smith (canoeist) (born 1987), Australian Olympic gold medal-winning canoeist

Others

 Dave Smith (comedian) (born 1982), comedian, podcaster, prominent Libertarian activist and speaker
 Dave Smith (priest) (born 1962), Australian Anglican parish priest
 Dave Smith (Peterborough, Ontario politician), Canadian politician

See also
David Smith (disambiguation)